Sean or Seán Ryan may refer to:

Politics
 Seán Ryan (Irish politician) (born 1943), Irish Labour Party politician
 Sean Ryan (American politician), New York state legislator

Sports
 Sean Ryan (tight end) (born 1980), tight end in the National Football League
 Sean Ryan (American football coach) (born 1972), American football coach and former player
 Sean Ryan (cyclist) (born 1941), British cyclist
 Seán Ryan (hurler) (born 1986), Irish hurler and former Gaelic footballer
 Seán Ryan (Offaly Gaelic footballer) (1939–2012), Irish Gaelic footballer
 Sean Ryan (rugby league) (born 1973), Australian former professional rugby league footballer
 Seán Ryan (sports administrator) (1895–1963), president of the Gaelic Athletic Association
 Sean Ryan (swimmer) (born 1992), American swimmer

Other people
 Seán Ryan (fiddler) (1919–1985), Irish folk music fiddler
 Sean Ryan (judge), Irish judge

See also
 Shaun Ryan, Australian rules football umpire
 Shawn Ryan (born 1966), American writer
 Sean Rhyan (born 2000), American football offensive guard